Ditrigona jardanaria is a moth in the family Drepanidae. It was described by Oberthür in 1923. It is found in western China and possibly Tibet.

The wingspan is 15.5-16.5 mm for males and 15-15.5 mm for females. The forewings are white with the costa pale buff proximally. There are five brownish grey, weakly lunulate fasciae, consisting of subbasal, antemedial, postmedial and two subterminal fasciae which are more distinct on the hindwings than on the forewings.

References

Moths described in 1923
Drepaninae
Moths of Asia